Otto George Mitchell (November 8, 1898 – August 8, 1938) was an American Negro league second baseman in the 1930s.

A native of Evansville, Indiana, Mitchell played for the Birmingham Black Barons in 1930. In 17 recorded games, he posted 21 hits with one home run in 74 plate appearances. Mitchell died in his hometown of Evansville in 1938 at age 39.

References

External links
 and Seamheads

1898 births
1938 deaths
Birmingham Black Barons players
Baseball second basemen
Baseball players from Indiana
Sportspeople from Evansville, Indiana
20th-century African-American sportspeople